European Addiction Research is a bimonthly peer-reviewed medical journal covering addiction medicine. It was established in 1995 and is published by Karger Publishers. The editors-in-chief are Falk Kiefer (Central Institute of Mental Health) and Anna Goudriaan (Academic Medical Center). According to the Journal Citation Reports, the journal has a 2017 impact factor of 2.653.

References

External links

Addiction medicine journals
Publications established in 1995
Karger academic journals
Bimonthly journals
English-language journals